London Exchange is an American freestyle band, originally from Miami, Florida, primarily consisting of Christopher Phipps and Martin Davis; the duo reconvened the band in 2009 with original drummer Tim Gavin rejoining them briefly in 2012.
The group's breakout hit was 1988 "Memories of You" a dance-freestyle-synthpop hit, it went to No.1 on Miami's Top 50 Dance Hits and No.5 on WPOW Power 96, Miami's leading CHR/Dance music radio station the song also charted on 27 other Billboard reporting stations across the US and was reviewed in Billboard Magazine.
The group has a loyal fan base in select US cities, Brazil, Spain and Russia. 
London Exchange was part of the American response to the Second British Invasion.

History

Founding and single releases 

The band was formed in the back-room home-studio of Christopher Phipps in Kendall, Florida a suburb of Miami in late 1986, with brother John Phipps, female vocalist BeBe Cager older sister of Elana Cager of the group L'Trimm,
Producer David Hanono of The Voice In Fashion and Engineer Douglas Edwards who Hanono had recruited from his bands' label Pantera Records.
 
Taking Dance/Freestyle that was the cutting-edge music of the time, and wanting to combine it with Synthpop/New Wave music from the early 80's Pre-Production started with future London Exchange Producer Peter Marr at his home studio in early 1987.
The band started their first actual recording session at The University of Miami studio in February 1987. 
During these recording sessions which took place at various studios around Miami over several months future London Exchange member Jose Conde was introduced to the band and contributed backing vocals, BeBe left the group, over creative differences, and then John Phipps was involved in a serious accident that sidelined him from performing in the band. 
At this point the song was unfinished and the future of London Exchange was uncertain. John Phipps would later return; successfully running the band's label, Merlin Records, and managing the group.
Following his brothers' accident Christopher starting working with Douglas Edwards at Natural Sound Studio, and also with Producer Peter Marr who was the touring drummer for the group Expose at the time, on early London Exchange demo's that culminated in a famous concert "Rock To Walk" at Miami's Cameo Theater and the song "The Girl Inside The Magazine". 
Under the stage name Chris Candy, the band which included David Hanono (electronic drums) and Douglas Edwards (synthesizer & open-reel tape machine) performed one show in late 1987 benefiting the Miami Project to Cure Paralysis.
Christopher Phipps returned to the studio in early 1988 with producer Peter Marr and recorded a three-song demo, that got the attention of Disc Jockey Phil Jones of Power 96 Radio in Miami, and they started recording the single "Memories of You" which was then released on the bands' independent label, Merlin Records, in late 1988. 
The song took off on both club and radio in the summer of 1989, and production and distribution was signed over to major independent label Vision Records for worldwide distribution.
Douglas Edwards and Jose Conde joined the band, and the trio performed a series of shows together starting at Miami's legendary Club-Nu. Douglas left the group shortly after and Hanono filled in on drums. Tim Gavin (drums) and Martin Davis (bass, keyboards) joined as permanent members in late 89, for the classic line-up that ran from 1989 to 1991. Subsequent singles followed "Lost Without Your Touch" 1989 and "The Girl Inside The Magazine" 1991 both charting on club and radio in the U.S and written up in Billboard and Dance Music Report.
The band performed live extensively during this time, playing all of the major dance clubs in Miami and did shows in New Orleans where they had developed a strong following.

The Lost London Exchange Album and Deus Ex-Machina 

In 1992 Tim Gavin and Martin Davis left the group to pursue other interests and Russian keyboardist programmer Alex Zaitsev, aka Alex DJ Sect, joined the band working with Christopher Phipps to record an unreleased album.
They also teamed up to record the techno track "The Threat of Aggression" under the name Deus-Ex-Machina which went to No.1 on the Techno Charts in Chicago and No.5 on Miami's TOP 50 Dance Chart
After negotiations with several record labels failed to secure the release of their completed London Exchange album, the group went on hiatus at the end of 1992.

Band Reunited

After connecting with fans, DJ's and other artists on social media sites, and seeing renewed interest in the band, Christopher Phipps and Martin Davis decided to reunite in 2008 and record the band's first new song "Fall Apart", with original producer Peter Marr and returned to the charts after a 17-year hiatus. They also commissioned the re-mix of their classic song "Memories of You", working with a talented group of cutting-edge electronic music DJ/Remix artists and producers from around the world, they completed the album Remix/Remodel and it was released in 2009.
Following this release, the band performed a series of reunion shows in Miami to promote the album.
The band then released the singles "We Are Not Together" in 2010 "Forever" in 2011 and also compilation EP of all six of their songs re-mastered and titled Trilogies 1989-1991/2009-2011. Late 2012 the band released the single "Time Will Tell" and worked with legendary Miami Producer Lewis Martineé on the remix. The band is currently in the studio working on remixes and new material for an upcoming album in 2014.

The band returned to its classic line-up of Tim Gavin, Martin Davis and Christopher Phipps and performed a one-off reunion show in Miami in January 2012.

Martin Davis and Christopher Phipps continue performing select shows as a power duo in 2013.

Side Projects

London Exchange member Christopher Phipps is also currently live keyboardist and backing vocalist in Miami band The Voice In Fashion.

Personnel

Complete band roster

This is a list of everyone who has performed or recorded as part of London Exchange.

 Christopher Phipps
 Martin Davis
 Tim Gavin
 Alex Zaitsev
 Jose Conde
 Douglas Edwards
 David Hanono
 BeBe Cager
 John Phipps

Discography

Albums

 London Exchange (1992) Un-Released
 Remix Remodel (2009)
 Trilogies 1989-1991/2009-2011 EP (2012)
 Remix Remodel 25YRS (2014)

Singles

 "Memories of You" (1988)
 "Lost Without Your Touch" (1989)
 "The Girl Inside the Magazine" (1991)
 "We Are Not Together" (2010)
 "Forever" (2011)
 "Time Will Tell" (2012)

Videos

 Memories Of You (Official Video)
 When Doves Cry  (Official Video)

External links
 London Exchange Official Website (http://www.londonexchange88.com)
 London Exchange on Facebook (https://www.facebook.com/LondonExchange)
 London Exchange on Twitter (https://twitter.com/londonexchange)
 London Exchange on SoundCloud (https://soundcloud.com/london-exchange)

References

American freestyle music groups
American synth-pop groups
Electronic music groups from Florida
Musical groups established in 1988